Allison Williams (born 15 March 1998) is an American-raised Saint Kitts and Nevis footballer who plays as a right back for the Saint Kitts and Nevis women's national team.

International career
Williams played for Saint Kitts and Nevis at senior level in the 2018 CONCACAF Women's Championship qualification. She was a half time substitution in the 0–11 loss to Canada at the 2020 CONCACAF Women's Olympic Qualifying Championship, one of the two biggest defeats in Saint Kitts and Nevis women's national team history.

Personal life
Williams' older sister Lauren is also a member of the Saint Kitts and Nevis women's national football team.

References

External links

1998 births
Living people
Women's association football fullbacks
Women's association football midfielders
Saint Kitts and Nevis women's footballers
Saint Kitts and Nevis women's international footballers
American women's soccer players
Soccer players from Pennsylvania
People from Lansdale, Pennsylvania
African-American women's soccer players
American people of Saint Kitts and Nevis descent
21st-century African-American sportspeople
21st-century African-American women